Grant Haley (born 20 September 1979) in Bristol, England, is an English retired professional footballer who played as a defender for Peterborough United in the Football League.

Playing career
Haley joined Norwich City aged 11, before transferring to Peterborough's youth academy at the age of 14.

He made his Peterborough debut against Southend United on 23 October 1999, and was man-of-the-match. However, he failed to make another first team appearance for the club, and joined non-League club Bedford Town on loan in 2000, before joining them permanently in 2001, also working in accounts.

References

External links

1979 births
Living people
Footballers from Bristol
English footballers
Association football defenders
Peterborough United F.C. players
Bedford Town F.C. players
English Football League players